Chapoutier, or Maison M. Chapoutier, is a winery and négociant business situated in Tain-l'Hermitage in the Rhône region in France. Chapoutier produces wine from appellations across the Rhône region, but it is typically their top Hermitage wines, both red and white, that receive the most attention and accolades. Chapoutier's wine labels are distinctive because of their inclusion of Braille writing on all labels since 1996.

History 
The Chapoutier family can trace their history in the Rhône region back to 1808, but it was in 1879 that Polydor Chapoutier bought his first vineyards and started the actual business. In the mid-20th century Max Chapoutier led the business, until his retirement in 1977, after which his sons Michel Chapoutier and Marc Chapoutier took over. Some years later, during the 1980s, quality improved, under Michel Chapoutier's leadership over the vineyards and winemaking facilities. By the late 1980s, Chapoutier had started to receive considerable international attention for the wines' quality.

Vineyards and wines 

Chapoutier produces wines from a range of appellations in northern and southern Rhône, as well as from some Roussillon appellations, and from collaborative projects in Portugal and Australia. The Chapoutier vineyards are all managed to produce biodynamic wines. A further characteristic of Chapoutier is a preference for single-variety wines, also from those appellations where blends are common. Thus, Chapoutier's Côte-Rôties are Syrah only (with no Viognier), the white Hermitages are all Marsanne only (with no Roussanne) and several of the Châteauneuf-du-Papes are Grenache noir only.

The winery's range of Rhône wines are grouped into four quality levels. The two basic levels are referred to as "Découverte" and "Tradition", the intermediate level "Prestige", and the top level "Fac&Spera". Wines at the Fac&Spera level are produced from the appellations Côte-Rôtie, Hermitage, Crozes-Hermitage, Saint-Joseph, Cornas, and Châteauneuf-du-Pape. Chapoutier is something of a champion of the white wines from those northern Rhône appellations more known for red wines, and produces many ambitious white wines from such appellations. Of the fifteen wines in the "Fac&Spera" range, ten are red and five white, including one sweet white wine, a Hermitage Vin de Paille.

Braille labeling

Chapoutier was the first wine producer to introduce braille on its labels, starting in 1994 with the Monier de la Sizeranne Hermitage wine. By 1996 this was expanded to include all wines bottled and sold by the Chapoutier winery. Michel Chapoutier had the idea to include braille on the label after hearing his friend the singer Gilbert Montagné, who is blind, explaining on TV that he would have to take someone with him into the store in order to identify each bottle of wine. The Monier de la Sizeranne vineyard that Chapoutier now owns and makes wine from, was founded by the Sizeranne family and the first and subsequent braille printing on this wine is a tribute to that family and specifically a blind member of the family, Maurice de La Sizeranne who was the founder and president of the French Association for the Blind and also developed an abbreviated version of braille. 

The information presented in the braille print includes the producer, the vintage, the vineyard and region as well as the colour of the wine.

References 

Wineries of France